Victor-Lucien-Sulpice Lécot (8 January 1831—19 December 1908) was a French  archbishop and cardinal of the Roman Catholic Church.

Biography
He was born in Montescourt-Lizerolles, and studied at the Minor Seminary of Compiègne and Major Seminary of Beauvais. He was ordained to the priesthood on June 24, 1855, and then taught at the Minor Seminary of Dijon until 1858. He also served as vicar of the Cathedral of Beauvais (1858-1872), military chaplain in the French Army during the Franco-Prussian War and pastor of the church of Saint-Antoine in Compiègne (1872-1886).

On the 10 June 1886, he was appointed Bishop of Dijon by Pope Leo XIII. He received his consecration on the following 11 July from Bishop Joseph-Maxence Péronne, with Bishops Paul-François-Marie de Forges and François-Marie Duboin, C.S.Sp., serving as co-consecrators. He was later transferred to the Roman Catholic Archdiocese of Bordeaux on 26 June 1890.

Pope Leo XIII created him Cardinal Priest of the Basilica of Santa Pudenziana in the consistory of 12 June 1893. He participated in the Papal Conclave of 1903, which elected Pope Pius X.

He died in Chambéry, aged 77. He is buried in the Metropolitan Cathedral of St. Andrew in Bordeaux.

References

1831 births
1908 deaths
Bishops of Dijon
19th-century French cardinals
20th-century French cardinals
Cardinals created by Pope Leo XIII
Archbishops of Bordeaux
French military chaplains
Franco-Prussian War chaplains